Tensho is a kata originating from Goju Ryu karate. Translated, it means "revolving hands", "rotating palms", or "turning palms." This kata emphasizes the soft aspects of Goju Ryu, and encompasses continuous, flowing movements. Tensho, along with its harder counterpart sanchin, was developed by Goju ryu founder Chojun Miyagi from earlier Chinese forms. Tensho may be a variant of the Southern Chinese Kung Fu form Rokkishu.

Tensho was created in 1921 as "softer sanchin" by Chojun Miyagi to balance Go aspect of Heishugata (Sanchin-kata) with Ju variation for Heishugata.  It combines hard dynamic tension with deep breathing and soft flowing hand movements. 

Some styles call it Rokkishu and it was created from some movements taken from Hakutsuru, although more careful analysis suggests that it might be Miyagi's personal interpretation of Kakuha-kata that was in Higashionna's syllabus but is omitted in Gōjū-ryū now.

References

Karate kata